Tricentenario is the fifth station of the Medellín Metro on Line A going north-south. It is located in the northern part of the municipality of Medellín, the second station in the territory of the municipality with the largest number of stations within the metropolitan area today. The station was opened on 30 November 1995 as part of the inaugural section of line A, from Niquía to Poblado.

It lies between two major traditional working class areas of the city of Medellín: the Castilla and Aranjuez municipalities. With the town of Bello, said municipalities evolved through the history of development of the metropolitan area as the main areas of labor during industrialization.

Description
From the station part two pedestrian bridges to the east and west that connect the two main urban axes of northern Medellín: the west provides access to the Castilla district (commune 5) and the east leads to the Aranjuez (commune 4).

References

External links
 Official site of Medellín Metro 

Medellín Metro stations
Railway stations opened in 1995
1995 establishments in Colombia